Onufryjewo  is a village in the administrative district of Gmina Ruciane-Nida, within Pisz County, Warmian-Masurian Voivodeship, in northern Poland. 

The village has a population of 120.

References

Onufryjewo